Corymbia oocarpa is a species of tree that is endemic to the Top End of the Northern Territory. It has thin rough bark on the lower part of the trunk, smooth bark above, lance-shaped to curved adult leaves, flower buds in groups of seven, white flowers and barrel-shaped to urn-shaped fruit.

Description
It has thin, rough grey to orange-brown that is thinly tessellated towards the base of the trunk, smooth grey and cream-coloured above. Flowering has been observed in March and the flowers are white.

Taxonomy and naming
This species was first formally described as Eucalyptus oocarpa in 1987 by Denis Carr and Stella Carr from specimens collected in the Katherine Gorge National Park in 1967 by Norman Byrnes. In 1995 Ken Hill and Lawrie Johnson changed the name to Corymbia oocarpa.

Distribution and habitat
Corymbia oocarpa grows in sand in depressions on or near hard outcrops of sandstone. The range of the tree is confined to an area in the Top End of the Northern Territory, extending from coastal area near Mudginberry south through Pine Creek, the Arnhem Plateau to Katherine Gorge.

See also
 List of Corymbia species

References

oocarpa
Myrtales of Australia
Flora of the Northern Territory
Plants described in 1995
Taxa named by Maisie Carr